Gila is the debut studio album of German krautrock band Gila. The album has the subtitle Free Electric Sound, and often the album title is written as Gila – Free Electric Sound.

Track listing
 "Aggression" – (4:33) 
 "Kommunikation" – (12:47) 
 "Kollaps" – (5:30) 
 "Kontakt" – (4:30) 
 "Kollektivität" – (6:40) 
 "Individualität" – (3:36)

Personnel
 Daniel Alluno – drums, bongos, tabla
 Fritz Scheyhing – organ, Mellotron, percussion, electronic effects
 Conny Veit – electric and acoustic guitars, vocals, tabla, electronic effects
 Walter Wiederkehr – bass

References 

Gila (band) albums
1971 debut albums